Sakura was a Japanese brand of cigarettes that was owned and manufactured by Japan Tobacco.

History
Sakura was launched on February 1, 2005. Limited sales began in the Kagoshima and Miyazaki prefectures.

The concept is a real cigarette that inspired cherry and sublimed Japanese elements. Old cherry blossom was involved in the development of president Katsuhiko Honda, then president. New Sakura made a more contemporary product such as lowering tar value compared to the old Sakura and introducing D-spec, but the pack design and basic elements had not been changed.

Old cherry blossom variant has been discontinued after January 2006.

After that, a "D-spec" (low smoke smell) version of Sakura was sold in the Kanagawa Prefecture only on October 2, 2006 (5 other JTI brands were simultaneously sold in this limited area).

New cherry blossoms were discontinued as of January, 2011 due to poor sales.

They were of traditional Japanese cigarette sizes: short (70 mm) or king size (85 mm) or long (100 mm). They came within a soft or hard pack, 10 or 20 cigarettes per pack. The Japanese word Sakura means "cherry blossoms".

Products
 Sakura Cherry Blossoms (old)
 Sakura Cherry Blossoms (new)

Below are all the variants of Pianissimo cigarettes, with the levels of tar and nicotine included.

See also
Smoking in Japan
Fashion brands

References

Japanese cigarette brands
Japan Tobacco brands